|}

The Ayr Gold Cup is a flat handicap horse race in Great Britain open to thoroughbreds aged three years or older. It is run at Ayr over a distance of 6 furlongs (1,207 metres), and it is scheduled to take place each year in September.

History
The event was established in 1804, and it was originally held at Ayr's former racecourse at Belleisle. In the early part of its history it was restricted to horses bred and trained in Scotland. It was initially contested over two separate heats of two miles, and was subsequently a single race with a two-mile distance.

The Ayr Gold Cup became a handicap in 1855, and it was shortened to about a mile in 1870. The Belleisle track closed in 1907, and the race was relocated and cut to 6 furlongs in 1908.

The lightest winning weight in the race since it became a sprint is 6 st 13 lb (44 kg). This was carried to victory by Marmaduke Jinks in 1936. The heaviest is 10 st (63½ kg), the burden of Roman Warrior in 1975. The latter horse, trained at Ayr by Nigel Angus, is the most recent winner trained in Scotland.

The field for the Ayr Gold Cup is formed from the highest-weighted horses entered for the race. The maximum number of runners is currently twenty-seven. Those eliminated are now offered the chance to compete in the Ayr Silver Cup, a consolation race introduced in 1992. An event for horses excluded from that race, the Ayr Bronze Cup, was established in 2009.

Records
Most successful horse (3 wins):
 Dazzle – 1889, 1890, 1891

Leading jockey (4 wins):
 Tom Nicholson – Dominie Skelp (1827), Brunswick (1830), Gondolier (1831), Masetto (1834)
 William Noble – Despot (1836), The Doctor (1840), The Recorder (1842), The Shadow (1843)
 (note: the jockeys of some of the early winners are unknown)

Leading trainer (15 wins):
 Tom Dawson – Inheritor (1835, 1838), Despot (1836, 1837), The Doctor (1840), Doctor Caius (1841), The Recorder (1842), The Shadow (1843, 1844), Inheritress (1845, 1846), Stilton (1852), Itch (1854), Tabouret (1868), Good Hope (1869)
 (note: the trainers of some of the early winners are unknown)

Winners since 1980
 Weights given in stones and pounds.

Earlier winners

 1804: Chancellor
 1805: Chancellor
 1806: Young Newbyth
 1807: Juno
 1808: Young Daffodil
 1809: Bit of Tartan
 1810: colt by John Bull
 1811: Ayrshire Lass
 1812: Ardrossan
 1813: Snodgrass
 1814: Ardrossan
 1815: Marquis
 1816: Kate Kearney
 1817: Glengary
 1818: Sans Culottes
 1819: Monreith
 1820: Chance
 1821: colt by Stamford
 1822: colt by Viscount
 1823: Lancer
 1824: Stratherne
 1825: Lancer
 1826: Robin Hood
 1827: Dominie Skelp
 1828: Mary
 1829: Spadassin
 1830: Brunswick
 1831: Gondolier
 1832: Vyvyan
 1833: Philip
 1834: Masetto
 1835: Inheritor
 1836: Despot
 1837: Despot
 1838: Inheritor
 1839: Lanercost
 1840: The Doctor
 1841: Doctor Caius
 1842: The Recorder
 1843: The Shadow
 1844: The Shadow
 1845: Inheritress
 1846: Inheritress
 1847: Eryx
 1848: Chanticleer
 1849: Glen Saddel
 1850: Elthiron
 1851: Elthiron
 1852: Stilton
 1853: Testator
 1854: Itch
 1855: John Dory
 1856: The Assayer
 1857: Gathercole
 1858: Trip the Daisy
 1859: Susannah
 1860: Greta
 1861: Bloomsbury
 1862: Little Captain
 1863: Bohemian
 1864: Newchurch
 1865: Nothing More
 1866: Fitzroy
 1867: Miss Havelock
 1868: Tabouret
 1869: Good Hope
 1870: Lady of Lyons
 1871: Irregularity
 1872: Alaric
 1873: Lord Derby
 1874: Servia
 1875: Munden
 1876: Coltness
 1877: Ivy
 1878: Sutler
 1879: Umbria
 1880: Strathblane
 1881: Heath Bird
 1882: Tita
 1883: Tibicen
 1884: Perdita
 1885: Daylight
 1886: Daylight
 1887: Mirth
 1888: Reverie
 1889: Dazzle
 1890: Dazzle
 1891: Dazzle
 1892: Horton
 1893: Once More
 1894: Mimram
 1895: Linton
 1896: Athel
 1897: Athel
 1898: Gyp
 1899: Portebella
 1900: Child Waters
 1901: Caedmon
 1902: Lovetin
 1903: Kirkbride
 1904: King's Birthday
 1905: Kilglass
 1906: Cyrus
 1907: Charis
 1908: Raeberry
 1909: Alwine
 1910: Raeberry
 1911: Saucy John
 1912: Grammont
 1913: Borrow
 1914–16: no race
 1917: Wayward
 1918: no race
 1919: Beresina
 1920: Forest Guard
 1921: Self Sacrifice
 1922: Soldennis
 1923: Baydon
 1924: Westmead
 1925: Phalaros
 1926: Lord Wembley
 1927: Martenax
 1928: Nothing Venture
 1929: Tommy Atkins
 1930: Heronslea
 1931: Heronslea
 1932: Solenoid
 1933: Ken Hill
 1934: Figaro
 1935: Greenore
 1936: Marmaduke Jinks
 1937: Daytona
 1938: Old Reliance
 1939–45: no race
 1946: Royal Charger
 1947: Kilbelin
 1948: Como
 1949: Irish Dance
 1950: First Consul
 1951: Fair Seller
 1952: Vatellus
 1953: Blue Butterfly
 1954: Orthopaedic
 1955: Hook Money
 1956: Precious Heather
 1957: Jacintha
 1958: Rhythmic
 1959: Whistling Victor
 1960: Dawn Watch
 1961: Klondyke Bill
 1962: Janeat
 1963: Egualita
 1964: Compensation
 1965: Kamundu
 1966: Milesius
 1967: Be Friendly
 1968: Petite Path
 1969: Brief Star
 1970: John Splendid
 1971: Royben
 1972: Swinging Junior
 1973: Blue Cashmere
 1974: Somersway
 1975: Roman Warrior
 1976: Last Tango
 1977: Jon George
 1978:  Great
 1979: Primula Boy

See also
 Horse racing in Great Britain
 List of British flat horse races

References

 Paris-Turf: 
 Racing Post:
 galopp-sieger.de – Ayr Gold Cup.
 pedigreequery.com – Ayr Gold Cup – Ayr.
 
 Race Recordings 

Flat races in Great Britain
Ayr Racecourse
Open sprint category horse races
Recurring sporting events established in 1804
Sports competitions in Scotland
1804 establishments in Scotland